, known mononymously as L, is a fictional character in the manga series Death Note, created by Tsugumi Ohba and Takeshi Obata. He is an enigmatic, mysterious, and highly-esteemed international consulting detective whose true identity and background is kept a secret. He communicates with law enforcement agencies only through his equally inexplicable handler/assistant, Watari, who serves as his official liaison with the authorities. Though his past is shrouded in mystery, he has gained a reputation as arguably the world's greatest detective/criminal profiler.

Throughout the series, he observes and spies on the activities of the series' protagonist, Light Yagami, a high school genius. L attempts to expose Light as the infamous serial killer "Kira", who is responsible for massacring high-profile criminals worldwide through apparently supernatural means. As the series progresses, the psychological mind-game between L and Light intensifies, and each becomes bent on uncovering the other's true identity through a series of intricate ploys and schemes. He serves as an ideological and visual foil to Light.

Creation and conception
Tsugumi Ohba, the writer of the series, created L as a young adult, since he believed the story would not hold much interest if L were significantly older than his opponent, Light. For L's name, he wanted to use a single letter with a lot of significance; he considered "I" and "J", but eventually he chose "L" after careful consideration. Ohba left most of  L's character design to Takeshi Obata, artist of the series. Obata asked Ohba if L could be "unattractive". Afterwards Ohba included ideas in his thumbnails, including L's manner of sitting, "he's English", and "he's listless". Ohba added details regarding L's mannerisms and his interests in sweets. Ohba credits Obata for the character designs. Obata commented that L's thumbnails by Ohba had no bags under his eyes, and that he had a "plain face with no expression" which was very useful. Obata drew L as an "attractive young man" until chapter 11, when the character appeared in person. After chapter 11, Obata and Ohba agreed to contrast his appearance with Light's.

During the development of the early manga chapters, Obata feared L would appear "so suspicious that Light would know instantly it was L if they ever met". When Obata's editor told him that he wanted L to have a face "looking cool based on the angle", Obata added black bags under L's eyes. Obata cited Devilman'''s Akira Fudou when stating that he believed that black bags were appealing. In addition, Obata thought of a "dead eyes" concept, which involved L having "all-black eyes" and "mostly no eyebrows". Obata believes that black eyes usually makes a character goofier, but the bags "sharpen the character's gaze". Obata believes that the design evokes "a feeling of mystery" and that the reader cannot determine L's true thoughts. Obata also said that the bags under L's eyes were useful for inspiring speculation about his lifestyle and background. The outfit Obata designed for L was a "simple" white, long-sleeved shirt and jeans, to convey that L does not put thought into choosing his clothing. In Death Note 13: How to Read, Ohba presented an initial rough draft of L and said that, with a "cool expression" and without the bags under his eyes, L looked like a different person.

Obata stated that the peculiar traits exhibited by L are best revealed "gradually". Obata added that if he drew L eating "mountains of sweets" before revealing his face, he would not have "much credibility as a super detective" and people would ask if he was "crazy".
Both Ohba and Obata chose L as their favorite character from the series, with the former noting him as the "strongest" character in the series besides Light, and the latter due to "appearance, personality, everything". Obata said that he could never have created a character like L and that he enjoyed drawing him. Obata added that because of this, L was not "real" to him and that he liked that aspect of the character.
 
L's fighting style has been described as similar to capoeira. However, Obata has denied considering this when drawing L's fights, saying that he was thinking of the most effective way to kick someone whilst handcuffed. He added that if the style resembles capoeira, then this "adds another element to it" and "that makes me happy". When designing color illustrations, Obata assigned specific colors to the main characters to help "get the atmosphere right"; gold was assigned to L.

Casting
In the anime adaptation, he is voiced by Kappei Yamaguchi in Japanese, and by Alessandro Juliani in English. He is portrayed by Kenichi Matsuyama in the live-action film series, by Kento Yamazaki in the TV drama, and by Lakeith Stanfield in the American film.

Film adaptations
Matsuyama had trouble portraying L and worried about his performance. He reasoned that L rarely interacted with others, and so portrayed him as if he did not "quite understand other people on an emotional had trouble emulating L's postures. He also ate sweets like those that L would eat, and considered the details of L's signature gestures. Matsuyama said that he and Tatsuya Fujiwara, the actor portraying Light, became "so immersed" in their character portrayals that they did not speak to one another while on the set; when filming ceased they conversed and "went out for a drink or two". Hideo Nakata, the director of L: Change the World, told The Daily Yomiuri that he wanted to exhibit L's "human side" that was not exhibited in the Death Note series.

Appearances
In Death Note

He never shows his face to the world, instead representing himself with a capital L in blackletter font. His real name, L Lawliet, is only revealed in the guidebook Death Note 13: How to Read.

Whilst presented as an enigmatic, nameless, highly-intelligent, cunning and globally-esteemed international consulting detective, L is revealed to actually be a tall, disheveled and gaunt youth in his 20s with a pale complexion and visible dark circles around his eyes. He is a socially-inept, awkward and somewhat misanthropic recluse. He has many notable quirks and eccentricities, such as holding things with his index finger and thumb, crouching instead of sitting, mostly walking around barefoot, and having an unnatural affinity for sweets, cakes, candies, dairy foods and confectionery foods. He is seen exclusively eating these foods but this diet has no apparent effect on his health and physiology. Even with these eccentricities, he is a highly-skilled, intellectually-astute and brilliant criminologist/crime investigator. He may come off as cold and cynical and often utilizes questionable methods and mostly takes up solving cases out of boredom rather than a sense of duty. However, he does have a strict moral code, is aware of his own flaws and shortcomings and is unwilling to cross morally repugnant standards, unlike Kira.

L has spent most of his life dedicating himself to solving crime cases, and hunting down and apprehending notorious criminals and felons around the world. It is implied that he suffers from loneliness, internal torment and low self-esteem, even calling himself "a monster" at one point. He also possesses an unusually high intellect and uncanny skills in strategy, deduction, observation, reasoning and profiling, which have given him a high reputation amongst law enforcement agencies worldwide. At the start of the series, L carries out his own investigation of a series of mysterious serial-killings across the globe, all of which are carried out by an apparent supernatural serial-killer known as "Kira", which is the Japanese transliteration of the English word "killer". After deducing that the serial-killings are all connected and perpetrated by a single mastermind and are sourced from Japan, L allies himself with the Japanese police force and assists them in investigating the murders. Although he strongly suspects the series' protagonist, Light Yagami, a high school genius and the son of detective superintendent Soichiro Yagami, one of the primary members of the Kira investigation allied with L, to be Kira's alter-ego, he is unable to prove his theory, due to lack of evidence, but nonetheless remains suspicious of Light and carefully observes him.

The majority of the series' initial focus is on L and Light's complex, cerebral and intricate psychological mind-game of cat and mouse, as both use their wits and intellect in an attempt to outdo the other and expose them. Though L comes very close to exposing Light as Kira, he is eventually killed by Rem before he can do so, but before his death his suspicion is confirmed that Light is Kira. Although L's death regresses the Kira investigation's progress, he had prepared a contingency plan to ensure that someone would continue the work of hunting down and apprehending Kira, by selecting two gifted child orphans to be his potential successors, one of whom eventually succeeds in exposing Light as Kira. Although his true identity and birth name is obscured in mystery throughout the series, L utilizes a number of aliases to maintain his anonymity, such as "Hideki Ryuga" or "Ryuzaki", the latter of which he uses as his primary pseudonym throughout the Kira investigation. Ohba said that L is the most intelligent character in the entire Death Note series because "the plot requires it."

In film

L is portrayed by Kenichi Matsuyama in the live-action films that adapt the Death Note manga, with his portrayal and characterization of the character receiving wide praise for being earnestly faithful to his original manga counterpart. Unlike the manga, in the second film, his "death", caused by Rem writing his name in her Death Note, does not take effect, as L had written his own name in Misa's Death Note earlier.

In the 2008 movie L: Change the World, which takes place in the 23 days that L has left before he dies, L decides to solve one last case, stopping a bio-terrorist organization led by "K" from spreading a deadly virus around the world. Along the way he meets a girl named Maki, FBI agent Suruga, and a boy whom he names Near. In the course of the film, L grew to have a close relationship with Near and Maki, and while he treats Maki like a younger sister, the girl seemingly became attracted to him. A day before his death, L made Near his successor and entrusted him to be taken care at the same orphanage where he grew up in.

In Death Note: Light Up the New World, Kenichi Matsuyama reprises his role as L. He makes a cameo appearance with child Ryuzaki, who inherits his DNA, giving him a lollipop and telling him to not use the Death Note as Ryuzaki promises not to. He is also seen in a CG video that Ryuzaki created.

Lakeith Stanfield portrays L in the live-action American film adaptation. In this adaptation, he is shown as an enigmatic, skillful and highly esteemed international consulting detective. He is calm and calculating, yet socially inept and eccentric. He communicates with the authorities only through his handler/assistant, "Watari", and is affiliated with a number of law enforcement agencies such as the FBI, CIA and Interpol. He has earned a reputation for solving numerous cold cases, and takes up the task of apprehending the world-famous serial killer known as "Kira", who is responsible for massacring numerous high-profile criminals around the world through apparently supernatural means. This version of the character retains much of his manga counterpart's traits and characteristics, such as his preference to crouch rather than sit, his fondness for sweets, his socially-awkward, quirky and eccentric personality, and his tendency to hold things with his index finger and thumb. His past also originates from a secluded orphanage, though his real name is given as "Lebensborn Atubia".

After deducing Kira's location in Seattle by purposely seeding the names of obscure criminals to "Kira", he assists police detective James Turner, the local head of the "Kira" investigation in Seattle. As the investigation progresses, L deduces that "Kira" needs a name and face to kill his victims and eventually suspects Light Turner, James' teenaged son, is connected to the murders. L obsessively tries to expose him and assigns a group of FBI agents to shadow him, along with other potential "Kira" suspects. As the film progresses, he demonstrates a darker, more aggressive, unstable and morally ambiguous side of his personality, which is intensified by the eventual deaths of the FBI agents (which is attributed to Kira) and Watari's sudden disappearance.

L becomes emotionally unstable and attempts to attack Light in his home when he refuses to confess that he is "Kira". L begins his own manhunt for Light when Watari is seemingly murdered by "Kira", and James issues an arrest warrant for L, whom he sees as increasingly unstable. Light hoodwinks the authorities by manipulating a number of criminals to continue carrying out his activities through the Death Note, while inducing himself into a medical coma. This seemingly proves Light's innocence, and L is taken off the case. After deducing Light's girlfriend Mia Sutton's connection with the serial-murders, L finds a hidden page of the Death Note within her home and contemplates writing Light's name in it. Elsewhere, Light is visited by Ryuk, the Death Note's original owner, who comments on how interesting he finds humans.

L's background and past is briefly explored in this adaptation. His childhood originates from a secluded and currently abandoned orphanage named the St. Martin's Orphanage. There, he was subjected to a series of tests and experiments as part of a clandestine government project to raise intellectually-gifted orphans into skilled black ops agents. As a result, his mental psyche was severely affected, which explains his unusual quirks and his unstable, irrational behavior in the film's second half. After his training and the institute's subsequent shutdown, L gained a reputation as an expert international detective with the help of Watari, who kept his mental stability in check and acted as a handler.

In other media
In the light novel Another Note: The Los Angeles BB Murder Cases, L recruits FBI agent Naomi Misora to investigate a series of murders. While the story includes several phone discussions with him from Misora's perspective, he only appears in person at the end of the novel, when he goes by the name "Ryuzaki" - an alias he appropriates from the novel's serial murderer, Beyond Birthday, who masquerades as L under the alias "Rue Ryuzaki". The light novel also says that L won the aliases Eraldo Coil and Deneuve in a "detective war" with the real Coil and Deneuve.

In the musical adaptation, L is portrayed by Teppei Koike in the Japanese version and Kim Junsu in the Korean version. In the demo recording, he was portrayed by Jarrod Spector

In the live-action TV drama, L is portrayed by Kento Yamazaki. The miniseries version has a few differences with other versions. His main outfit in the ministries is a white shirt and white trousers. While capturing Higuchi, Light saves L's life from Higuchi's gunshot. Later, while L tells Light that Light had written L's name in a false Death Note and that L will tell others that Light is Kira, Mikami kills L. Then Near takes L's place and follows the videos left by L. L's funeral is shown at the end of the series.

Reception
 
Publications from manga and anime have commended L's character. Tom S. Pepirium of IGN describes L as "the coolest, most well developed character in anime today". Pepirium said that the "excellent translation" is responsible for L being a "success" in the English-language dub of Death Note. Anime News Network found that the mental duels between L and Light are appealing to viewers of the series due to how each attempts to discover the identity of the other while at the same time wanting to hide their own. The Hyper staff and Mania Entertainment's Julie Rosato agreed with Martin, with the latter commenting that L's and Light's rivalry as one of the best parts from the series to the point of being something "unique" in a manga. PopCultureShock writer Carlos Alexandre also praised their rivalry, he found L to be "too smart" noting that "some careful listening and application of critical thinking will make apparent the holes in L’s supposedly superhuman logic, holes that simply, given L’s character, should not be there". While reviewing the manga's third volume, Mania Entertainment concludes the article by saying that L "wins this volume; he really drove it forward" due to how close he gets to Light in such little time, which makes Light lose his temper after meeting him despite how calm he normally is. Pepirium adds that Alessandro Juliani, L's voice actor, portrays his slurping and gulping sweets as "somehow non-irritating". Theron Martin has also repeatedly praised Juliani's work, noting that he "captures the eccentric brilliance of L". IGN ranked him as the 12th greatest anime character in 2009, saying that "Every good lead character needs a challenge, and L provided the opposition that the Death Note'' series required to captivate fans." and ranked him as the 19th greatest anime character in 2014. Manga artist Katsura Hoshino, a former assistant of Takeshi Obata, has said that she likes the way the L is often drawn as he gives the appeal of a chill character.
 
In January 2007, Oricon made a poll in which they asked Japanese fans from manga and anime which characters from any series they would most like to see in spinoff series. The overall winner from the poll was L, who also ranked first in the women's poll and second in the men's poll. In the Society for the Promotion of Japanese Animation Awards (SPJA) from 2008 Alessandro Juliani was the winner in the category "Best Voice Actor (English)" for his work as L. Kappei Yamaguchi was the winner in the category "Best Voice Actor (Japanese)" from the 2009 SPJA Industry Awards for his work as L. L also won in the category "Best Male Character". In the NEO Awards 2007 from Neo, L won in the category "Best Manga Character".

See also

 List of Death Note characters

References

Martial artist characters in anime and manga
Comics characters introduced in 2003
Death Note characters
Fictional capoeira practitioners
Fictional code names
Fictional English people
Fictional murdered people
Fictional private investigators
Male characters in anime and manga